Castern Wood is a nature reserve of the Staffordshire Wildlife Trust. It is an ancient woodland, with scrub and grassland, on the eastern slopes of the Manifold Valley, about 1 mile south of Wetton, in Staffordshire, England.

The reserve is designated a Site of Special Scientific Interest and a Special Area of Conservation.

Description
There is a car park a short distance from the reserve at Weags Bridge.  The circular walk through Castern Wood is very steep in places.

Trees in the ancient woodland include ash, field maple, hazel and oak. There is also scrub and grassland. To prevent the grassland becoming scrub, and the scrub becoming woodland, the site is managed; since cattle grazing is difficult to arrange on this relatively inaccessible site, clearing scrub from grassland is done by volunteers.

Many plant species grow on the limestone soil, including small scabious, ladies mantle, salad burnet and several species of orchid. Woodland plants include dog's mercury and wood avens.

References

External links
 "Staffordshire Rivers Living Landscape" Staffordshire Wildlife Trust

Ancient woods in England
Forests and woodlands of Staffordshire
Nature reserves in Staffordshire
Sites of Special Scientific Interest in Staffordshire
Special Areas of Conservation in England